Bellingshausen Island is one of the most southerly of the South Sandwich Islands, close to Thule Island and Cook Island, and forming part of the Southern Thule group. It is named after its discoverer, Baltic German-Russian Antarctic explorer Fabian von Bellingshausen (1778–1852).

Its southeast point is called Isaacson Point; first charted by Discovery Investigations personnel on the Discovery II in 1930 and named for Ms. S.M. Isaacson, an assistant to the staff of the Discovery Committee.

See also 
 Hardy Point
 List of Antarctic and sub-Antarctic islands
 Salamander Point

References

External links 

Photos of the island can be found at:
 http://www.photo.antarctica.ac.uk/external/guest/detail/personal/10005836/1/8
 http://cedric-in-antarctica-2009.blogspot.com/2010_02_01_archive.html

Islands of the South Sandwich Islands
Volcanoes of the Atlantic Ocean
Volcanoes of South Georgia and the South Sandwich Islands
Uninhabited islands of South Georgia and the South Sandwich Islands